Canyondam (formerly, Canyon Dam) is a census-designated place (CDP) in Plumas County, California, United States. The population was 31 as of the 2010 census, down from 37 as of the 2000 census. On August 6, 2021, the community was destroyed in the Dixie Fire.

History
The Canyondam post office opened in 1940, closed in 1944, and reopened in 1952.

An earthquake measuring 5.7 Mw struck on May 23, 2013, and was felt over much of Northern California with a maximum Mercalli intensity of VII (Very strong).

Dixie Fire

On August 6, 2021, the Dixie Fire burned through the town on its path to Lake Almanor. Around 95% of the structures were destroyed, including the post office.

Geography
Canyondam is located at  (40.169921, -121.075586).

Climate
This region experiences warm (but not hot) and dry summers, with no average monthly temperatures above 71.6 °F.  According to the Köppen Climate Classification system, Canyondam has a warm-summer Mediterranean climate, abbreviated "Csb" on climate maps.

Demographics

2010
At the 2010 census Canyondam had a population of 31. The racial makeup of Canyondam was 26 (83.9%) White, 0 (0.0%) African American, 3 (9.7%) Native American, 2 (6.5%) Asian, 0 (0.0%) Pacific Islander, 0 (0.0%) from other races, and 0 (0.0%) from two or more races. Hispanic or Latino of any race were 2 people (6.5%).

The whole population lived in households, no one lived in non-institutionalized group quarters and no one was institutionalized.

There were 17 households, 4 (23.5%) had children under the age of 18 living in them, 6 (35.3%) were opposite-sex married couples living together, 2 (11.8%) had a female householder with no husband present, 1 (5.9%) had a male householder with no wife present.  There were 1 (5.9%) unmarried opposite-sex partnerships, and 0 (0%) same-sex married couples or partnerships. 7 households (41.2%) were one person and 2 (11.8%) had someone living alone who was 65 or older. The average household size was 1.82.  There were 9 families (52.9% of households); the average family size was 2.44.

The age distribution was 4 people (12.9%) under the age of 18, 2 people (6.5%) aged 18 to 24, 5 people (16.1%) aged 25 to 44, 16 people (51.6%) aged 45 to 64, and 4 people (12.9%) who were 65 or older.  The median age was 48.5 years. For every 100 females, there were 121.4 males.  For every 100 females age 18 and over, there were 107.7 males.

There were 27 housing units at an average density of 34.8 per square mile, of the occupied units 11 (64.7%) were owner-occupied and 6 (35.3%) were rented. The homeowner vacancy rate was 0%; the rental vacancy rate was 14.3%.  18 people (58.1% of the population) lived in owner-occupied housing units and 13 people (41.9%) lived in rental housing units.

2000
At the 2000 census there were 37 people, 21 households, and 11 families in the CDP. The racial makeup of the CDP was 89.19% White, and 10.81% Native American.
Of the 21 households 14.3% had children under the age of 18 living with them, 33.3% were married couples living together, 4.8% had a female householder with no husband present, and 47.6% were non-families. 42.9% of households were one person and none had someone living alone who was 65 or older. The average household size was 1.76 and the average family size was 2.18.

The age distribution was 13.5% under the age of 18, 5.4% from 18 to 24, 16.2% from 25 to 44, 43.2% from 45 to 64, and 21.6% 65 or older. The median age was 50 years. For every 100 females, there were 117.6 males. For every 100 females age 18 and over, there were 128.6 males.

The median household income was $40,104 and the median family income  was $35,000. Males had a median income of $0 versus $41,250 for females. The per capita income for the CDP was $22,620. None of the population and none of the families were below the poverty line.

Politics

References

Census-designated places in California
Census-designated places in Plumas County, California
Destroyed towns